Sinctuary is the second full-length album by Heavy/Power metal band Symphorce.

Track listing
"Eye of Horus" - 5:34
"Holy Sin" - 5:57
"Until the Last" - 5:07
"Blackened Skies" - 5:29
"Burning Star" - 4:57
"Insight" - 5:01
"Reveal the Secrets" - 3:53
"Soulfly" - 4:58
"Nice Dreams"* - 4:20
"Resting Places"* - 3:34
"Freedom" - 5:44
"Gone Too Far" - 4:55

 (*)These are all bonus tracks on the limited edition.
 "Nice Dreams" is a POWERMAD cover.

Credits
Vocals : Andy B. Franck

Guitars : Cedric Dupont

Bass : Dennis Wohlbold

Drums : Stefan Köllner

Keyboards : H. Peter Walter

2001 albums
Symphorce albums
Noise Records albums